The Best of Everything is a 1959 American drama film  directed by Jean Negulesco from a screenplay by Edith Sommer and Mann Rubin, based on the 1958 novel of the same name by Rona Jaffe. It stars Hope Lange, Stephen Boyd, Suzy Parker, Martha Hyer, Diane Baker, Brian Aherne, Robert Evans, Louis Jourdan, and Joan Crawford. The film follows the professional careers and private lives of three women who share a small apartment in New York City and work together in a paperback publishing firm. Alfred Newman wrote the musical score, the last under his longtime contract as 20th Century-Fox's musical director.

Plot
Recent Radcliffe College graduate Caroline Bender is hired as a secretary at Fabian Publishing Company. She works for Amanda Farrow, a bitter, demanding, middle-aged editor who resents Caroline and suspects she wants her job. Caroline meets two other young women in the typing pool — April Morrison, a naïve rube from Colorado, and Gregg Adams, a glamorous aspiring actress — and the three women become roommates.

April is assigned to work for the lecherous editor-in-chief Mr. Shalimar, who persuades her to work late one night in a ploy to sexually harass her. When she rejects him, he is undaunted and continues to pursue other young female employees. At an alcohol-fueled office party, an intoxicated Mr. Shalimar makes sexual overtures to Barbara Lamont while they are alone in her office. Sidney Carter, a co-worker with whom she has an affair, intervenes to stop Shalimar after he hears Barbara yelling. Shalimar shows no remorse over the incident and suggests that, because Lamont has been married and divorced, she should expect such advances from male co-workers.

Gregg is cast in a play directed by David Savage and the two become lovers. Gregg is demoted to understudy when she repeatedly flubs her lines. She becomes obsessed with David, whose affections turn to Gregg's replacement in the play. After David ends his affair with Gregg, she becomes mentally unstable and starts stalking him. While lurking outside his apartment, she is startled by a boisterous neighbor and panics. Gregg flees to a fire escape and falls to her death when her high-heeled shoe gets caught in the grating, causing her to stumble.

April meets Dexter Key, a spoiled playboy, at a company picnic. They start an affair, but Dexter threatens to dump the romantic April unless she agrees to have sex. When April becomes pregnant, Dexter persuades her to ostensibly elope. Once they are en route, Dexter admits his marriage proposal is a ruse and he is driving her to a doctor for an abortion. Distraught at the idea of ending her pregnancy, April leaps from Dexter's moving car. She survives, but the impact causes a miscarriage and hospitalization. April becomes romantically involved with her attending physician.

Caroline, upset after her fiancé Eddie Harris marries another woman, goes on a blind date with Paul Landis. The date ends awkwardly when Caroline spots a co-worker, Mike Rice. After Paul leaves, Mike and Caroline get drunk, and she falls asleep at his apartment. At the office the next day, a badly hungover Caroline is worried she and Mike had sex, but he assures her nothing happened.

While working for Amanda Farrow, Caroline adds her own editorial comments to the manuscripts submitted by writers. Shalimar takes notice of Caroline's comments and promotes her to the position of manuscript reader. When Caroline thanks Farrow for recommending her as a reader, Farrow admits she advised Shalimar not to promote her. Later Mike disparages Caroline's ambition and advises her not to become career-driven, but to seek marriage instead.

Mike and Caroline consider becoming involved romantically, but their plans are interrupted by Eddie, who dines with Caroline while in New York on a business trip. Thinking Eddie wants to leave his wife and rekindle their relationship, Caroline visits his hotel room; she leaves after Eddie reveals he has no intention of divorcing his rich wife and only wants Caroline to be his mistress.

When Farrow quits her job to marry a man and move to St. Louis, Caroline takes her place at Fabian. Caroline relinquishes the position when Farrow returns to New York after her marriage fails. While leaving the office one day, Caroline bumps into Mike. She lifts the veil and removes the black hat she is wearing to mourn Gregg's death and locks eyes with him; they walk away together as the film ends.

Cast
 Hope Lange as Caroline Bender
 Stephen Boyd as Mike Rice
 Suzy Parker as Gregg Adams
 Martha Hyer as Barbara Lamont
 Diane Baker as April Morrison
 Brian Aherne as Fred Shalimar
 Robert Evans as Dexter Key
 Brett Halsey as Eddie Harris
 Donald Harron as Sidney Carter
 Louis Jourdan as David Savage
 Joan Crawford as Amanda Farrow
 Ted Otis as Dr. Ronnie Wood

Production
20th Century Fox producer Jerry Wald announced he was buying the rights to the novel of the same name in April 1958. In his first interview about the film adaption, Wald said: "There are 10 roles in this for young people, and I hope to get some of our outstanding actors such as Lee Remick, Hope Lange, Diane Varsi, Suzy Parker, Robert Evans, Lee Philips and Bob Wagner." In further early casting considerations, Wald mentioned Joanne Woodward, Audrey Hepburn, Lauren Bacall and Margaret Truman. Rona Jaffe officially sold the rights to her book for $100,000 in November 1958. She did not want any part in writing the screenplay, but instead wanted a cameo role: "I want to appear in the movie in a walk-on part. I would just appear briefly as one of the office's pool of stenographers", she said.

Martin Ritt initially was set to direct, but he was replaced by Jean Negulesco in January 1959 reportedly because Ritt was upset with the casting of Suzy Parker. Ritt dismissed this rumor, saying the script was not his "cup of tea". When she learned that Wald was sick, Parker agreed to do the film, reporting for work in January 1959. (Parker had agreed to take the role in the summer of 1958, but a broken arm and a 14-month recovery delayed her appearance.) On playing a neurotic actress, Parker commented: "I know the type extremely well."

During casting, several actors were considered, cast and replaced. In August 1958, Diane Varsi and Lee Remick were, along with Suzy Parker, attached to star in the film, but Varsi and Remick withdrew. Remick was forced to leave production in early 1959 due to physical problems. In September 1958, Julia Meade signed on for the film, planning to make her screen debut. She ultimately did not appear in the film. In January 1959, the unknown actress Diane Hartman was cast as Barbara Lamont, but she was replaced by Martha Hyer. Jack Warden agreed to a co-starring role in March 1959, but he did not appear in the film. Less than a month later, Jean Peters was planning to make her comeback in this film. Had Peters not been replaced, it would have been her fifth film under the direction of Negulesco. Another actress cast in March 1959 without appearing in the film was June Blair, who was set to play one of the starring roles.

Joan Crawford was cast in May 1959, 10 days before shooting began. This was the first time she had accepted a supporting role since the silent era. Crawford was in heavy debt after the death of her fourth husband Alfred Steele, and needed the money. She commented on her role: "I'm on the screen only seven minutes. But I liked the part, and I want to do other movies and TV films if I can find what I want." She had recently been elected to the board of directors of Pepsi-Cola and planned to spend more time promoting the soft drink. Crawford insisted on having a Pepsi-Cola machine placed in the secretaries break room in the film. According to Diane Baker, much of Crawford's character was cut from the finished film, including a show-stopping drunk scene. This was reportedly due to the film's length.

Music
The score was composed and conducted by Alfred Newman, with orchestrations by Earle Hagen and Herbert Spencer.  Additional development of Newman's themes were done by Cyril Mockridge for two scenes. The songs "Again" and "Kiss Them for Me" (by Lionel Newman) and "Something's Gotta Give" (by Johnny Mercer) are used as source music.

The title song for the film was composed by Newman, with lyrics by Sammy Cahn, and performed by Johnny Mathis. Producer Jerry Wald first showed interest in Mathis for the title song in August 1958.

The music, as recorded for the motion picture, was released on CD by Film Score Monthly in 2002.

Reception
In The New York Times, critic Howard Thompson described the film as a "handsome but curiously unstimulating drama" and noted "the casting is dandy" with kudos to Lange. Commenting on Joan Crawford, the critic described her performance as "suave trouping". Thompson pointed out that "...for all its knowing air and chic appointments, the picture talkily lumbers onto the plane of soap opera, under Mr. Negulesco's reverential guidance."

Paul Beckley ended his review in the New York Herald Tribune with: "...Miss Crawford comes near making the rest of the picture look like a distraction."
	
Crawford's peripheral role in the film generated much criticism. The men she was involved with romantically never appeared on the screen, and many of her scenes were cut, as mentioned above.

Due to the film's success, a short-lived daytime soap opera of the same name was aired on ABC in 1970.

Oscar nominations
The Best of Everything received two Oscar nominations during the 32nd Academy Awards: Best Original Song for the title song and Best Costumes-Color (Adele Palmer).

See also
 List of American films of 1959

References

External links
 
 
 
 Various releases on LP and CD of the music from the film

1959 films
1959 romantic drama films
20th Century Fox films
Adaptations of works by Rona Jaffe
American romantic drama films
Films based on American novels
Films directed by Jean Negulesco
Films scored by Alfred Newman
Films set in New York City
Films shot in New York City
CinemaScope films
1950s English-language films
1950s American films